Sir Richard George Augustus Levinge, 7th Baronet (1 November 1811 – 28 September 1884) was an Irish landowner and politician from Knockdrin Castle, County Westmeath. He sat in the House of Commons of the United Kingdom from 1857 to 1865.

Life

His mother was a sister of the 2nd Baron Rancliffe, who died without issue in November 1850. Sir Richard inherited his uncle's entailed property, valued at between £1,000 and £2,000 per annum.
In 1846 he was commissioned as Lieutenant Colonel of the Westmeath Militia.
He was Sheriff of Westmeath in 1851–2,
and in 1853 was appointed as a Deputy Lieutenant of the county.

At the 1852 general election, he contested the Westmeath constituency as a Conservative, without success.

Five years later, at the 1857 election,
he was returned unopposed for Westmeath as an Independent Opposition candidate.
That party collapsed in 1859, he was re-elected at the 1859 general election,

as a Liberal.

He did not contest the 1865 election.
He was asked to stand again at the 1868 general election, but refused. He said that although he was a Liberal on all other points, he was a staunch Protestant, and opposed the Liberal policy of disestablishing the Church of Ireland.

He died in Brussels on Sunday 28 September 1884, aged 73.  He was succeeded in the baronetcy by his brother Vere Henry Levinge, an officer in the Madras Civil Service.

Family

Richard was brother to Commodore Reginald Thomas John Levinge of the Royal Navy.

Works 
 Echoes from the Backwoods; or, Sketches of Transatlantic Life (London, 1846, 2 vols.)
 Cromwell Doolan; or, Life in the Army (London, 1849, 2 vols.) (Internet Archive)
 A Day With the Brookside Harriers at Brighton (London, 1858) (Internet Archive)

References

External links 
 

1811 births
1884 deaths
People from County Westmeath
Baronets in the Baronetage of Ireland
Members of the Parliament of the United Kingdom for County Westmeath constituencies (1801–1922)
UK MPs 1857–1859
UK MPs 1859–1865
High Sheriffs of County Westmeath
Deputy Lieutenants of Westmeath
Conservative Party (UK) parliamentary candidates
Irish Liberal Party MPs